Higham may refer to:

Places
Higham, Derbyshire, England
Higham, Kent, England
Higham, Lancashire, England
Higham, South Yorkshire, England
Higham, Babergh, Suffolk, England
Higham, West Suffolk, Suffolk, England
Cold Higham, Northamptonshire, England
Higham Ferrers, Northamptonshire, England
Higham Gobion, Bedfordshire, England
Higham on the Hill, Leicestershire, England

People
 Higham (surname)

See also
 High Ham, a village and civil parish in Somerset, England
 Highams Park, a district in the London Borough of Waltham Forest, England.